Boana joaquini is a species of frog in the family Hylidae that is endemic to Brazil. Its natural habitats are subtropical or tropical seasonally wet or flooded lowland grassland, subtropical or tropical high-altitude grassland, rivers, and pastureland.

References

Boana
Endemic fauna of Brazil
Amphibians described in 1968
Taxonomy articles created by Polbot